Revolutionary Workers League may refer to:

Revolutionary Workers League/Ligue Ouvrière Révolutionnaire, a Canadian Trotskyist group
Revolutionary Workers League (in Manitoba)
Revolutionary Workers League (Oehlerite), a U.S. group that existed in the 1930s, founded by Hugo Oehler
Revolutionary Workers League (U.S., 1976), a U.S. Trotskyist group founded in 1976
Revolutionary Workers League (Britain), a British group in the late 1930s
Revolutionary Workers League (New Zealand)

See also
Workers Revolutionary League